Oh Se-hoon (Korean: 오세훈, Hanja: 吳世勳; born January 4, 1961) is a South Korean politician who is currently the serving Mayor of Seoul since 8 April 2021. He also previously served as a member of the National Assembly of South Korea from 2000 to 2004, and the mayor of Seoul from 2006 to 2011. Oh is a lawyer by profession.

Personal history 
Oh was born in Seongdong-gu, Seoul. He graduated from Daeil High School and went on to study at Hankuk University of Foreign Studies. He graduated from Korea University's School of Law and became a lawyer. In 2000, Oh was elected as a member of the 16th National Assembly of South Korea.

On July 1, 2006, Oh began his first term as the mayor of Seoul. Oh was reelected for his second term in 2010. In 2021, he was the winner of the Seoul mayoral by-election, beginning his third term on April 8, 2021.

Oh had spent time in London, United Kingdom as a fellow at the Faculty of Social Science & Public Policy at King's College London, focusing on major cities around the world seeking ways to create jobs and help promote economic growth.

In the 21st parliamentary election at Gwang-jin district, he lost to Ko Min-jung who is a political rookie.

He is Catholic and his baptism name is Stephen.

Conduct

Arts 
Oh was involved with the Seoul Foundation for Arts and Culture,  participating in a  celebration video for the organization alongside  foundation chairman Park Bum-Shin and  Seoul Arts Director Ahn Eun-Mi.

DDP 
Dongdaemun Design Plaza was constructed during his tenure.

LGBTQ rights  
When asked about the Seoul Queer Culture Festival during the 2021 Seoul mayoral race, Oh has stated that, "In a broader spectrum, the principle is that the rights of minorities, including sexual minorities, must be protected and there should be no discrimination." He further went on to say, "I think the debate was on the queer festival being held in the central area near City Hall and Gwanghwamun Plaza, and the city of Seoul has a special committee to make a decision, and there are rules to that as well."

Nuclear weapons 
Oh Se-hoon supports South Korea having Nuclear weapons, In March 2023 he called for it.

Seoul City Water Project 
Although most Seoul residents choose to drink bottled mineral water, it has been reported that Oh Se-hoon not only vouches for, but drinks the city tap water. Encouraging Seoul residents to drink tap water and reduce dependence on bottled water, as well as publicizing the cleanliness of Seoul tap-water has been a pet project for Oh.

Seoul City has recently put forward new regulations on tap-water and the focus has gone from not just safe water but water that tastes great.

WikiLeaks 
In a document released by WikiLeaks,  it was reported that in Oh's discussion with Alexander Vershbow in 2006 he stated that  a merger between the Grand National Party and the Democratic Party would be beneficial to the GNP.

Electoral history

Writings 
 가끔은 변호사도 울고싶다 (When a Lawyer Wants to Cry) by Oh Se-hoon (Myeongjin Publishing, October 1995) 
 우리는 실패에서 희망을 본다  (Failure Offers Seeds of Hope) by Kang Won-taek, Kim Ho-ghi, Oh Se-hoon, and Lee Young-jo (Hwanggeumgaji Publishing, August 2005)

References

External links 

 이명박+오세훈은? "소비에트식 콘크리트 아파트!", Korean editorial article critical of Oh's and Lee Myung-bak's urban and environmental policies 

|-

1961 births
Living people
People from Seoul
Haeju Oh clan
South Korean Roman Catholics
Korea University alumni
20th-century South Korean lawyers
21st-century South Korean lawyers
Members of the National Assembly (South Korea)
Liberty Korea Party politicians
People Power Party (South Korea) politicians
Mayors of Seoul
20th-century South Korean politicians
21st-century South Korean politicians